The following is a list of the churches in Florence, Italy. For clarity, it is divided into those churches that are north and south of the River Arno.

North of the Arno
Florence Cathedral (Duomo di Santa Maria del Fiore)
Florence Baptistery (Battistero di San Giovanni)
Santissima Annunziata, Florence (Basilica della Santissima Annunziata)
Badìa Fiorentina
Chiesa Valdese (Union of Methodist and Waldensian Churches)
Gesù Pellegrino
Ognissanti
Orsanmichele
Sant'Agata
Sant'Ambrogio
Sant'Apollonia
Santi Apostoli
San Barnaba
San Carlo dei Lombardi
Santa Croce, Florence (Basilica di Santa Croce di Firenze)
Sant'Egidio
San Filippo Neri
San Gaetano
San Giovanni di Dio
San Giovannino dei Cavalieri
San Giovannino degli Scolopi
San Giuseppe
 San Jacopo tra Fossi (Evangelical Methodist Church of Florence)
San Lorenzo
Santa Lucia
San Marco
Santa Margherita de'Cerchi
Santa Margherita in Santa Maria de'Ricci
Santa Maria degli Angeli
Santa Maria dei Candeli
Santa Maria della Croce al Tempio
Santa Maria Maddalena dei Pazzi
Santa Maria Maggiore
Santa Maria de' Ricci
Santa Maria Novella
Santa Maria Sovraporta (deconsecrated)
Santa Maria della Tromba
San Martino del Vescovo
San Michele Visdomini
San Pancrazio (deconsecrated)
San Paolino
San Pier Scheraggio (destroyed)
San Remigio
Santa Reparata (destroyed)
San Salvatore al Vescovo
San Salvi
Santi Simone e Giuda
Santo Stefano al Ponte
Santa Trìnita

South of the Arno
Basilica di San Miniato al Monte
San Carlo dei Barnabiti
San Felice
Santa Felicita
San Francesco di Paola
San Frediano in Cestello
San Giorgio sulla Costa
San Jacopo sopr'Arno
San Leonardo in Arcetri
Santa Lucia dei Magnoli
Santa Maria del Carmine
Santa Maria al Pignone
St Mark's English Church
Santa Monica
San Niccolò sopr'Arno
San Piero in Gattolino
Santa Rosa
San Salvatore al Monte
Santo Spirito
San Vito
Madonna delle Tosse 
Madonna del Buon Consiglio (Jesuit)

References

Florence
Florence